Akkuyu is a village in the Nizip District, Gaziantep Province, Turkey. It is inhabited by Turkmens of the Barak tribe and had a population of 109 in 2022.

References

Villages in Nizip District